Fatty Arbuckle's American Diners was an American-themed restaurant chain in the United Kingdom. The Manchester-based business was founded in 1983 by Pete Shotton, an associate of The Beatles. It focused on large portions at cheap prices. The name refers to Hollywood director and star of silent movies Roscoe "Fatty" Arbuckle.

Growth and demise
The chain, which saw two-thirds of all restaurants operated by franchisees, had grown to more than 30 outlets by September 1996, after its first franchise opened in 1991. 

Its flagship diner was in London's West End, with other outlets at Tottenham, Harrow, and Islington, in North London, Feltham in West London, Glasgow, Birmingham, Cardiff, Canterbury, Chester, Oxford, Rhyl, Manchester, Warrington, Salford Quays, Liverpool, Bradford, Bedford, Milton Keynes, Belfast, Winchester, Wigan, Stoke-on-Trent, Poole, Southampton, Dundee, Shrewsbury, Southsea, Teesside, Bristol, Ipswich, Newport, Morecambe, and Grimsby. In the beginning of the 2000s, founder Shotton sold the chain for an undisclosed sum. 

"Fatty" was removed from the name, and the restaurants were rebranded "Arbuckle's". The branch in Warrington opened in 1997, on the Riverside Retail Park. 

The last remaining Arbuckle's was closed by 2006. The name was bought out, and a new restaurant bearing the same name opened in the town of Downham Market (Norfolk) in 2008. A new store was opened in Ely in March 2017, on the leisure park, which includes Cineworld. The business became owned by an employee ownership trust in December 2018, meaning it is now owned by its employees.

References

Restaurant groups in the United Kingdom
Restaurants established in 1983
1983 establishments in England
British companies established in 1983
2000s disestablishments in England